Robin Malý (born May 17, 1989) is a Czech professional ice hockey player. He played with HC Sparta Praha during the 2010–11 season.

References

External links

1989 births
Czech ice hockey defencemen
HC Sparta Praha players
Living people
Competitors at the 2017 World Games
World Games gold medalists
LHK Jestřábi Prostějov players
HC Stadion Litoměřice players
HC Berounští Medvědi players
Czech expatriate ice hockey players in Germany
Czech expatriate ice hockey players in Slovakia
Czech expatriate sportspeople in France
Czech expatriate sportspeople in Poland
Expatriate ice hockey players in France
Expatriate ice hockey players in Poland